Flight Lieutenant Walter Fraser Anderson  (6 October 1890 – 15 September 1936) was a Royal Flying Corps (RFC) and Royal Air Force (RAF) pilot who served in World War I and the Allied effort in the Southern Russia Intervention. He was later a commercial pilot for British Airways Ltd.

Early life

Born in Ryde, Isle of Wight, Anderson was the youngest son of Capt John Weir Anderson and moved to Toronto when a child.

Military career

In Russia the RAF supported the Allies in their efforts to defend against and attack Bolshevik forces. During a reconnaissance mission three de Havilland DH.9A planes of the RAF's No. 47 Squadron were flying over southern Russia. While taking pictures of Bolshevik units, ground fire punched holes in the fuel tank of the DH.9A of Flight Lieutenant Walter Anderson (pilot) and observer officer John Mitchell. Mitchell was able to stop the loss of fuel by climbing onto the wing and plugging the holes with his fingers. When another DH.9A was forced down by the anti-aircraft fire, Anderson and Mitchell landed to pick up its crew, Captain William Elliot (later Air Chief Marshal) and Lieutenant Laidlaw. Mitchell was still on the wing and Laidlaw took over his Lewis machine gun in the rear cockpit in order to hold off a Bolshevik cavalry charge. With a punctured fuel tank, Mitchell holding onto the wing to plug the fuel tank, and two extra passengers, Anderson was able to get his plane into the air again. The four of them returned safely to the Russian RAF base. 

Anderson and Mitchell would be nominated for the Victoria Cross, but supporting documentation was lost during the evacuation from Russia. On another mission in Russia, Anderson and another observer, Captain George G. MacLennan of Owen Sound, Ontario, shot down an observation balloon and then bombed a Bolshevik airfield at Tcherni-Yar. During the engagement, MacLennan was mortally wounded by anti-aircraft fire and bled to death before the plane could land.

Later life and death
Walter Anderson left the RAF in 1927 and became a  commercial pilot for British Airways Ltd. He died in a crash at Gatwick Airport, London, on 15 September 1936. The crash of the de Havilland D.H.86A was suspected to be caused by the radio operator getting his foot caught between the fire extinguisher and the second rudder bar.

He was buried at St Nicholas' Church, Worth in West Sussex.

Personal life 

He married Phyllis Mary Joseph of Zeitorin, Cairo on 2 February 1922 at the British Consulate and later at the All Saints' Cathedral, Cairo. He petitioned for divorce in 1934. In 1936 he remarried.

Bibliography 
Notes

References
 - Total pages: 288 
 
 

 

1890 births
1936 deaths
Burials in Sussex
Royal Flying Corps officers
Royal Air Force officers
Recipients of the Distinguished Flying Cross (United Kingdom)
Companions of the Distinguished Service Order
Victims of aviation accidents or incidents in 1936
Royal Air Force personnel of the Russian Civil War
British Airways people
People from Ryde
Aviators killed in aviation accidents or incidents in England
Military personnel from the Isle of Wight